was a tanker that was built in 1938 for Japanese owners. She was chartered by the Imperial Japanese Navy and Imperial Japanese Army during World War II: the ship was sunk in January 1945 at Takao, Formosa by American aircraft. Salvaged in 1946, she was allocated as a war prize to China and renamed Yung Hao, but was forced to remain at Hong Kong by the British. She was requisitioned by the Admiralty during the Korean War and allocated to the Royal Fleet Auxiliary. She was to have been named RFA Surf Pilot but due to her poor condition she did not serve in the Royal Fleet Auxiliary. She served as Surf Pilot, a tender to  until 1958 and was subsequently scuttled off Pulau Aur, Malaya in 1960.

Description
The geared steam turbine engine, placed aft, was manufactured by Ishikawajima Shipbuilding & Engineering Co, Tokyo.

History

Japanese service
Kuroshio Maru was built as yard number 264 by Harima Zōsen KK, Aioi, Harima for Chigai Kisen KK, Tokyo. She was laid down on 21 January 1938 and was launched on 8 December. Completion was on 28 February 1939. Her port of registry was Tokyo. The Japanese Official Number 45674 and Code Letters JZPM were allocated. She was operated by Tyugai Kaiun KK between Japan and the west coast of the United States. On 15 August 1941, Kuroshio Maru was requisitioned on charter by the Imperial Japanese Navy. She entered to Tama Zosen shipyard on 22 August for conversion work. On 5 September she was registered as a naval auxiliary ship. The conversion work was completed on 17 October and she was subsequently assigned to the Combined Fleet. She sailed from Sasebo on 30 November for Pulau Condore Island. Kuroshio Maru arrived at Sasebo on 16 February 1942 and was then sent to Kobe for a refit by Kawasaki Shipbuilding Corporation.

The charter to the Imperial Japanese Navy was terminated on 1 May and Kuroshio Maru was returned to her owners.  She was chartered afresh on 23 May by the Imperial Japanese Army and refitted by Harima Zosensho KK. She sailed between Japan, China, Formosa, French Indochina, Malaya, the Philippines and Singapore over the next few years carrying oil, troops and military cargo. On 10 September 1942 she collided with the coaster , which sank. Kuroshio Maru was bombed and sunk on 9 January 1945 at Takao, Formosa by aircraft of Task Force 38, United States Navy. The ship was removed from the Imperial Japanese Army list on 1 March.

Post-war history
In 1946, the ship was refloated and allocated as a war prize to China and placed under the ownership of China Merchants Steam Navigation Company, Shanghai. In 1947 she was sent to the Hong Kong and Whampoa Dock for repairs. New electrical systems and radar were fitted and her accommodation was rebuilt. During that time the ship was transferred to the China Tanker Co Ltd, Hong Kong and re-entered service in 1950 as Yung Hao with China still claiming ownership. Her crew defected to the Communist Chinese side in March 1951. On 12 March 1951, an emergency Cabinet meeting was held by the Hong Kong Government to discuss the ship. Four days later, the Chinese Government reiterated its claim to the ship, stating that it held the British Government liable for any interference in the free movement of the vessel, leading to the lodging of a claim for compensation. Yung Hao was requisitioned by the British Admiralty on 7 April to prevent her falling into Chinese hands on orders from Governor Sir Alexander Grantham. The next day, the issue was raised in the British Parliament. Answering a question from Ernest Kinghorn, Secretary of State for the Colonies James Griffiths stated that the requisitioning had been done in consultation with the British Government and was to prevent North Korean and Chinese forces using the ship.

The Chinese called her seizure an act of piracy, robbery and open provocation. China requisitioned all property belonging to the British-owned Asiatic Petroleum Company in retaliation for the seizure of the ship.

The intention was that she would be repaired and sailed to the United Kingdom for use by the Royal Fleet Auxiliary as RFA Surf Pilot''. However, she was discovered to be in a poor condition and was instead used as a tender to the shore establishment  at Singapore. Her future was "under consideration" in 1958, and in March 1960 she was scuttled off Pulau Aur, Malaya.

On 5 June 1987, the British and Chinese governments reached an agreement over the vessel and the requisitioning and a treaty to this effect was later signed in Beijing.

References

1938 ships
Ships built by IHI Corporation
Tankers of Japan
Merchant ships of Japan
Steamships of Japan
World War II merchant ships of Japan
Ships of the Imperial Japanese Army
Maritime incidents in September 1942
Maritime incidents in January 1945
Tankers of China
Merchant ships of China
Steamships of China
Tankers of Hong Kong
Merchant ships of Hong Kong
Steamships of Hong Kong
Diplomatic incidents
1951 in Hong Kong
1951 in China
1951 in the United Kingdom
Tankers of the United Kingdom
Merchant ships of the United Kingdom
Steamships of the United Kingdom
Surf-class tankers
Maritime incidents in 1960